"The Simple Things (Something Emotional)" is a song by Australian recording artist Vanessa Amorosi, released in September 2008 as the third and final single from Amorosi's third studio album Somewhere in the Real World.

Amorosi performed the song on the Australian Idol live decider on 29 September 2008.

Track listing

Charts

Release history

References

2008 singles
Vanessa Amorosi songs
Songs written by Pam Reswick
Songs written by Vanessa Amorosi
2008 songs
Universal Music Group singles